Greenhill is a village which lies in the Falkirk council area of Scotland. Greenhill is situated south of the Forth and Clyde Canal and north of the railway line at Greenhill Junction.

According to the 2001 census the village has 1,265 residents.

References

External links

Canmore - Greenhill Firebrick Works site record

Villages in Falkirk (council area)